The 1976 United States Senate election in New Jersey was held on November 2, 1976. Incumbent Democrat Harrison A. Williams defeated Republican nominee David A. Norcross with 60.66% of the vote.

Primary elections were held on June 8, 1976 and were uneventful. Williams easily staved off an anti-abortion campaign from attorney Stephen J. Foley. Norcross cleared a four-man field to win the Republican nomination in a landslide.

Democratic primary

Candidates
Stephen J. Foley, Deal attorney and anti-abortion activist
Harrison A. Williams, incumbent United States Senator

Campaign
Williams discounted Foley's campaign and referred to him as a single-issue candidate, though he admitted opposition to abortion was "an issue that deserves the most earnest, searching thought.” Foley's campaign was managed by future U.S. Representative Chris Smith.

Foley rejected the "single-issue" characterization, saying, “Pro‐life is not just antiabortion. It's anything that deals with the human equation, with human problems.”

Results

Republican primary

Candidates
David A. Norcross, former Executive director of the New Jersey Election Law Enforcement Commission
James E. Parker, retired sheets metal mechanic and Democratic candidate for U.S. House in 1958 and 1960
N. Leonard Smith, high school teacher, former member of the Clementon town council, and anti-abortion activist
Martin E. Wendelken, businessman and candidate for the U.S. House in 1972 and 1974

Campaign
Norcross held the endorsement of the state party organization, though Martin Wendelken had the support of the Bergen County organization and led a slate of candidates supporting Ronald Reagan's presidential campaign. Wendelken ran a campaign calling for a reduction in the size and scope of government, saying the key issues were unemployment and inflation.

James Parker ran a campaign calling for reduced utility rates. He said that he had switched parties in 1975 after Governor Brendan Byrne vetoed the Tocks Island dam. Leonard Smith said that his campaign was "concerned about the killing of babies... I just can't believe that our country can solve its problems by killing babies.”

Results

General election

Candidates
Hannibal Cundari (Libertarian)
Bernardo S. Doganiero, perennial candidate (Socialist Labor)
Leif O. Johnson (Labor)
David A. Norcross, former Executive director of the New Jersey Election Law Enforcement Commission (Republican)
Harrison A. Williams, incumbent Senator since 1959 (Democratic)

Campaign
Despite the state's Republican lean in the presidential race, Williams was the heavy favorite for re-election due to his personal popularity. On a campaign stop in late October, Walter Mondale called Williams “the most popular Senator in Washington.”

Norcorss ran on a moderate platform, calling for adjustments to Medicare to ensure “more preventive care and less need for institutionalization” and expanded access to Social Security benefits for high earners. He attempted to appeal to urban voters by calling for tax deductions for mass transit and an expanded loss deduction for small business owners who were victims of crime.

Norcross attempted to use his expert knowledge of campaign finance to attack Williams as a "special interest" legislator engaged in an “odd‐couple relationship by wooing both organized labor and banking and securities interests.” Norcross singled out fundraising dinners at which Williams accepted donations from representatives of banks and securities firms which appeared before the Senate Subcommittee on Securities, which Williams chaired. "The subcommittee was considering important legislation affecting the securities industry, and the House legislation was considerably watered down when it came up for a Senate vote," Norcross said. "This is not just a campaign‐funding issue; it goes to the integrity of the legislature."

However, Norcross never gained traction with the electorate; he failed to raise enough money for radio or television advertising. Even several weeks into the campaign, polls showed that few voters knew his name. When President Gerald Ford visited the Paramus to campaign, he chose to have U.S. Senator Clifford Case on stage rather than Norcross.

Results

Aftermath
Although Norcross's attacks on Williams did not stick during the campaign, the Senator was convicted for bribery as part of the 1981 Abscam scandal before his term ended. He resigned from office before a scheduled vote to expel him from the Senate for "ethically repugnant" conduct.

See also
1976 United States Senate elections

References

1976
New Jersey
United States Senate